The Taiwan Electric Research and Testing Center (TERTEC) is a laboratory in Guanyin District, Taoyuan City, Taiwan.

History
In 1978, the Executive Yuan decided to set up a testing laboratory for high voltage and high power equipment. Taiwan Power Company and 13 other local companies then jointly established the Taiwan Electric Research and Testing Center in April 1979. In December 1998, the headquarters was relocated to Taiwan Technology headquarters building in Xindian City, Taipei County. In May 2003, the headquarters was moved again to its current location in Guanyin Township, Taoyuan County.

References

External links
 

1979 establishments in Taiwan
Organizations based in Taoyuan City
Research institutes established in 1979
Research institutes in Taiwan